Benjamín Fernando Vidal Allende (born 18 March 1991) is a Chilean professional footballer who plays for C.D. Antofagasta as a centre back.

Career

Youth career
Fuentes started his career at Primera División de Chile club O'Higgins. He progressed from the under categories club all the way to the senior team.

O'Higgins

Vidal debuted with O'Higgins in the match against Everton on 14 November 2010. The match finished 0:0.

In 2012, Vidal was runner-up with O'Higgins, after lose the final against Universidad de Chile in the penalty shoot-out. In 2013, he won the Apertura 2013-14 with O'Higgins. In the tournament, he played in 10 of 18 matches.

In 2014, he won the Supercopa de Chile against Deportes Iquique, playing the 90 minutes of the match.

He participated with the club in the 2014 Copa Libertadores where they faced Deportivo Cali, Cerro Porteño and Lanús, being third and being eliminated in the group stage.

Universidad de Chile
For the 2014–15 season, Vidal is signed for Universidad de Chile for a US$1.5M fee.

In the U dispute the Copa Libertadores 2015 and consecrated champion of the Apertura 2014, the Supercopa of Chile 2015 and the Glass Chile 2015, although without having more protagonism in the stellar equipment. As a result, in June 2016, his transfer to Palestine is confirmed.

Palestino
In the team led by Nicolás Cordova takes up regularity and becomes the owner of the team, fulfilling an outstanding participation in the Copa Sudamericana 2016, where his team would be eliminated in the quarterfinals at the hands of San Lorenzo de Almagro, after having left in the Way to Flamengo from Brazil.

Universidad Catolica
After a big step for Palestino, where he is in several parties, he is bought by the UC, who is left with 65% of Benjamin's pass

International career
Vidal played for Chile at the U18 and U20 levels. He scored a goal against New Zealand U17.

Honours

Club
O'Higgins
Primera División: 2013–A
Supercopa de Chile: 2014

Universidad de Chile
Copa Chile: 2015
Supercopa de Chile: 2015

Palestino
Copa Chile: 2018

Universidad Católica
 Supercopa de Chile: 2019
 Friendlies (1): Torneo de Verano Fox Sports 2019

Coquimbo Unido
 Primera B (1): 2021

Individual
O'Higgins
Medalla Santa Cruz de Triana: 2014

References

External links

Benjamín Vidal at Football Lineups

1991 births
Living people
People from Cachapoal Province
Chilean footballers
Chile under-20 international footballers
Association football defenders
O'Higgins F.C. footballers
Puerto Montt footballers
Universidad de Chile footballers
Club Deportivo Palestino footballers
Club Deportivo Universidad Católica footballers
Coquimbo Unido footballers
C.D. Arturo Fernández Vial footballers
Chilean Primera División players
Primera B de Chile players